Fantasmic! is a nighttime show at Disneyland and Disney's Hollywood Studios. The show formerly operated at Tokyo DisneySea. It features fireworks, characters, live actors, water effects, pyrotechnics, lasers, music, audio-animatronics, searchlights, decorated boat floats, and mist screen projections. The narrative of Fantasmic! is a voyage through Mickey Mouse's imagination that culminates in a battle against the Disney Villains.

Fantasmic! originated at Disneyland in 1992 after Walt Disney Creative Entertainment was asked to create a nighttime spectacular involving water and fireworks to reinvigorate the space in front of the Rivers of America. The area was reworked, including terracing the walkways to accommodate viewing and modifying part of Tom Sawyer Island to allow the show's staged live action segments. The producers employed the resources of Walt Disney Feature Animation and Walt Disney Imagineering.

A second version featuring new scenes opened at Disney's Hollywood Studios in 1998, and a third version premiered at Tokyo DisneySea in 2011, replacing BraviSEAmo!. An updated version of Disneyland's Fantasmic! debuted in 2017, featuring a re-recorded soundtrack in addition to new scenes, lighting, choreography and costumes. A third version premiered at Disneyland in 2022 with new clouded lasers and searchlights in the viewing area. A revamped version premiered at Disney's Hollywood Studios in 2022, with new scenes and special effects, which is part of Walt Disney World's 50th Anniversary celebration. A fourth version premiered at Disneyland in 2023 with new characters appearing in the finale and special effects, which is part of the Disney 100 Years of Wonder celebration.

Disneyland version

Synopsis
Fantasmic! takes place on the waters of the Rivers of America at Disneyland and on a stage across the waterway on Tom Sawyer Island.

The show begins with Mickey Mouse being transported into his dream. He dances and orchestrates various water fountain, pyrotechnic, projection, laser and lighting effects to the show's theme. Mist screens rise from the water, acting as projection surfaces for various scenes from Disney movies. The show then transitions into a jungle scene from The Jungle Book, featuring a  puppet of Kaa and three floating barges carrying King Louie and black-lit monkeys (that debuted in the Tokyo version) across the river stage. The song transitions into "Hakuna Matata". The music then segues into a dubstep rendition of "Pink Elephants on Parade" from Dumbo, as animated pink elephants appear onscreen and in the form of performers on the island. The scene then transitions to "Friend Like Me" from Aladdin. Sorcerer Mickey watches the Genie perform tricks. Then they go under the sea as they head into the world of The Little Mermaid and Finding Nemo. A bubble floats by and Jiminy Cricket appears onscreen, searching underwater for Pinocchio. An animated Monstro appears suddenly, accompanied by a heavy musical score as he crashes through water. The sea morphs into the "Sorcerer's Apprentice" flood scene. As Mickey looks around in the dark and asks "What's going on?", a ship caught in a storm appears. Captain Barbossa then appears on the mist screens.

A cannon is fired from Sailing Ship Columbia, portraying the Black Pearl from the Pirates of the Caribbean films. Jack Sparrow, Elizabeth Swann, and other pirates participate in a stunt sequence. The scene ends with fountains that look like explosions and a cannon fired from the Sailing Ship Columbia  (In earlier incarnations, the Columbia served as Captain Hook's pirate ship). As the scene concludes, Mickey paints the moon, with silhouettes of Peter Pan and the Darlings flying over it. Mickey's sorcerer hat is painted on the mist screen and the hat turns to clouds as Aladdin and Jasmine are on a physical magic carpet flying through the clouds while a rendition of "A Whole New World" plays. Then the carpet fades away and three small barges arrive carrying Belle and the Beast, Ariel and Prince Eric, and Rapunzel and Flynn Rider, with the accompanying signature melody from each film — "Beauty and the Beast," "Part of Your World," and "I See the Light".

Mickey's dream takes a turn for the worse. The magic mirror appears onscreen and tempts Mickey to enter the darker realms of his imagination. When asked if he has the courage, Mickey accepts the challenge, and the mirror traps Mickey inside. The Evil Queen, disguised as the old hag, calls all the villains to partake in Mickey's nightmare, invoking a riled Ursula who joins the Queen's plot to destroy Mickey. Ursula calls upon Chernabog, who summons deceased spirits. He then summons Maleficent (the true mastermind who wishes to take over Mickey's dream), who threatens Sorcerer Mickey as she transforms herself into an enormous dragon. Onstage, the 45-foot dragon sets the waters ablaze, breathing fire onto the river. Mickey defeats the dragon, destroying the villains in the process.

Tinker Bell then appears with the Mark Twain Riverboat approaching with fireworks, and a black and white Mickey from Steamboat Willie appears. Mickey then appears again to conduct a final set of fireworks and water fountains before leaving in a bright blast of fireworks.

Development
The original Disneyland soft opening and press premiere were scheduled to begin Wednesday, April 29, 1992 and continue through the weekend. By late afternoon, rioting began in Los Angeles following the acquittal of the Los Angeles police officers involved in the Rodney King beating. Promotional materials with the catchphrase "Be There When the Night Ignites" were quickly pulled from public circulation.

Refurbishments
Disneyland's Fantasmic! has undergone several technical refreshes. A new sound system debuted in the summer of 2007, along with new show barges featuring LED lighting arrays. A complete overhaul of the lighting system debuted in the spring of 2008. The three mainland lighting towers, which rise hydraulically from pits in the ground prior to the show, were rebuilt with pull-out slides for the new Clay Paky Alpha Spots and Washes and redesigned for the new Strong Gladiator IV followspots. The footlights on the mainland side at water level were replaced with LED fixtures. Refurbished pyrotechnic barges were given new technologies derived from Disneyland's Air-Launch Firework (ALF) system.

In 2008, the three original 70mm projectors were replaced with high definition (HD) digital projectors. A new audio-animatronic dragon (nicknamed Murphy by fans, after Murphy's law, when the dragon experienced multiple delays in 2009) was built to replace the previous dragon which had been a mechanical dragon's head on a JLG cherry picker. The new dragon was designed to be a full-bodied replica of Maleficent's final form in Sleeping Beauty, standing at 45 feet tall.

In early February 2010, the entire Rivers of America were drained. Both the Mark Twain and the Sailing Ship Columbia were refurbished, and the track along which the ships travel was replaced.  The show's underwater effects underwent maintenance as well, and the laser effects for the finale were upgraded. On August 28, 2010, the second-generation dragon broke again, partly collapsing during a performance. It was restored to the show on November 12, 2010.

On January 11, 2016, Fantasmic! and other attractions closed due to the construction of Star Wars: Galaxy's Edge. It reopened on July 15, 2017. This version features some scenes that are inspired by the defunct Tokyo DisneySea version of Fantasmic!, along with the "Imagination" song as part of the post-show.

Disney's Hollywood Studios version

Synopsis

The Florida version of the event and show takes place at the Hollywood Hills Amphitheater, with a rocky mountain and a façade of trees serving as the setting. The narrative of the Walt Disney World version is fairly similar to that of Disneyland's original version and defunct Tokyo DisneySea version, with the show's introduction and conclusion nearly identical. However, there are notable differences throughout the rest of the show.
 The Fantasia sequence at the beginning of the show transitions into a scene from The Lion King only.
 The Dumbo, Aladdin, Little Mermaid, and Finding Nemo sequences are replaced with a bubble montage of Disney animated films presented on the mist screens that includes The Lion King, The Jungle Book, Dumbo, Snow White and the Seven Dwarfs, Alice in Wonderland, Hercules, Pinocchio, Aladdin, Mulan, Cinderella, Lady and the Tramp, Fantasia, Tangled, The Princess and the Frog, Bambi, Beauty and the Beast, The Little Mermaid, and Frozen.
 The Pirates of the Caribbean segment is replaced with a medley of Disney heroes and heroines, featuring onstage appearances of Pocahontas, Mulan, Aladdin, Elsa, and Moana. From 1998 to 2020, the original show instead featured an onstage battle scene from Pocahontas during the entirety of this act.
 Snow White and her Prince still appear in the princess segment, performing "Someday My Prince Will Come", instead of Rapunzel and Flynn.
 The climax features more villains than in the Disneyland version. In addition to the Evil Queen, Ursula, Chernabog, and Maleficent, Cruella de Vil from One Hundred and One Dalmatians, Scar from The Lion King, Frollo from The Hunchback of Notre Dame, Jafar from Aladdin and Hades from Hercules also appear. 
 The battle between Mickey and the villains, as well as their subsequent defeat, is longer in the Florida version.
Mickey appears in his Brave Little Tailor attire and uses the sword to defeat Maleficent, in her dragon form.
Instead of the Mark Twain Riverboat, the characters appear on board the Steamboat Willie during the finale.

Hollywood Hills Amphitheater

The Hollywood Hills Amphitheater is a purpose-built seat riverside amphitheatre at the Disney's Hollywood Studios theme park in the Walt Disney World Resort, Florida, that showcases the nighttime spectacular Fantasmic!  It is located off of Sunset Boulevard, between The Twilight Zone Tower of Terror and the Theater of the Stars, where the Beauty and the Beast stage show takes place. The Fantasmic! stage in Florida is significantly larger than Disneyland's, featuring a man-made,  mountain on which Sorcerer Mickey stands and from which the dragon emerges. The amphitheater has 6,900 seats, with room for an additional 3,000 people standing. The moat around the island itself can hold  of water.

On September 15, 2015, it was announced that Pop Secret would become the official sponsor of Fantasmic! at Disney's Hollywood Studios. Prior to this, Fantasmic! was the only nighttime fireworks show at Walt Disney World without a sponsor, with Wishes gaining sponsorship from Pandora Jewelry in 2014, while IllumiNations: Reflections of Earth was sponsored by General Electric from 1999 to 2003 and sponsored by Siemens from 2005 until 2017.

Refurbishments 
On March 16, 2020, this version of Fantasmic! was temporarily closed due to the COVID-19 pandemic. On August 17, 2020, even though Walt Disney World reopened in July 2020, due to the ongoing on COVID-19 pandemic the Fantasmic! lagoon has been drained.

On November 20, 2021, it was announced that the show would get remastered to feature a new heroics sequence with segments from Pocahontas, Aladdin, Mulan, Moana, and Frozen. According to officials, it will now be 29 minutes long.

Alternate show: "Taste of Fantasmic!"
The Florida version has a four-minute-long substitute show that plays when inclement weather prohibits the presentation of the regular show. The alternative show does not showcase any of the performers, floats, or puppets due to the dangerous conditions that are posed to the performers because of the possibility of rain accumulating on the stage. Instead the ancillary show is a brief summation of the conventional show; including a fountain display synchronized to "Little April Showers", a sequence integrating the "Night on Bald Mountain" music, and a finale orchestrated with all of the usual pyrotechnics and musical fanfare from the original show's conclusion.

Tokyo DisneySea version
Fantasmic! debuted at Tokyo DisneySea on April 28, 2011, replacing the BraviSEAmo! show in the Mediterranean Harbor. The show was originally planned to debut on April 23 with the park's 10th Anniversary "Be Magical!" celebration, but was delayed by the Great East Japan Earthquake in March 2011. Originally, Fantasmic! was planned in 2001 for the park and the story would be themed around Tokyo DisneySea but was scrapped and instead DisneySea Symphony debuted. Many of the barges were reused from Tokyo DisneySea's former nighttime Christmas show “Candelight Reflections” but were reimagined.  The Christmas tree barge was used for Mickey's sorcerer hat. This barge would also be used for Tokyo DisneySea's former nighttime Christmas show “Colors of Christmas” (2012–2019). The natural gas line in the harbor and 5 water cannons originally used for BraviSEAmo! were also repurposed.

The show's score was recorded by the Royal Philharmonic Orchestra at Abbey Road Studios, composed by Don L. Harper, featuring Bruce Healey's theme from the original Fantasmic! at the US parks. The DisneySea version has new scenes and narrative elements, including scenes based on Aladdin, Finding Nemo, and Cinderella, and the original new song  "Imagination". This is the only version of Fantasmic! to not have a stationary stage, with the show taking place entirely on barges. All of the characters' dialogue and sung parts were recorded in Japanese by the characters' respective Japanese voice artists.

This version of Fantasmic! closed on February 29, 2020. It was originally scheduled to conclude its run on March 25, 2020 and then close March 26, but it was moved up due to the extended closure of Tokyo Disney Resort in response to the COVID-19 pandemic in Japan.

On July 20, 2020 the Oriental Land Company announced that Fantasmic! would be replaced by an all-new nighttime spectacular in honor of Tokyo DisneySea's 22nd anniversary celebration, called Believe! Sea of Dreams. The show debuted on November 11, 2022.

In late September, the Fantasmic! barges were spotted backstage. While it was thought that they would all be dismantled, it was discovered in February 2021 that Disneyland Paris had purchased the 4 main barges for Walt Disney Studios Park for a future nighttime spectacular on their future harbor/lagoon. This may be a similar version of Fantasmic!

In early January 2021, two of the main Fantasmic barges were spotted circling the harbor most likely training drivers for the new show.

On March 11, 2021, the former hat barge, now reimagined was docked in Mediterranean Harbor rehearsing for the new show.

Soundtrack
The soundtrack for the original Disneyland show was included in the 2015 release of Walt Disney Records The Legacy Collection: Disneyland.

Voice cast

Disneyland
 Wayne Allwine – Mickey Mouse (1992 version) / Bret Iwan – Mickey Mouse (2017 version)
 Heather Headley – Female Vocalist (Princess Medley)
 Chris Mann – Male Vocalist (Princess Medley)
 Robin Williams – Genie (archival recordings; 2017 version)
 Jared Butler – Jack Sparrow (voice-over; 2017 version)
 Geoffrey Rush – Hector Barbossa (archival footage; 2017 version)
 Eddie Carroll – Jiminy Cricket
 Corey Burton – Magic Mirror (2017 version), Chernabog, Captain Hook (1992 version), Mr. Smee (1992 version)
 Kathryn Beaumont – Wendy (1992 version)
 Louise Chamis – Evil Queen/Old Hag
 Pat Carroll – Ursula
 Linda Gary – Maleficent, Opening Announcer
 Tony Jay – Magic Mirror (1992 version)

Disney's Hollywood Studios
 Wayne Allwine – Mickey Mouse  (1998 version) / Bret Iwan – Mickey Mouse (2022 version)
 Eddie Carroll – Jiminy Cricket
 Louise Chamis – Evil Queen/Old Hag
 Tony Jay – Magic Mirror, Judge Claude Frollo
 Linda Gary – Maleficent, Opening Announcer
 Pat Carroll – Ursula
 Susan Blakeslee – Cruella de Vil 
 Jonathan Freeman – Jafar
 Jim Cummings – Scar
 James Woods – Hades
 Corey Burton – Chernabog
 Linda Hunt – Grandmother Willow (1998 version)
 David Ogden Stiers – Governor Ratcliffe (1998 version)
 Judy Kuhn – Pocahontas (archival recordings; 2022 version)
 Brad Kane – Aladdin (archival recordings; 2022 version)
 Idina Menzel – Elsa (archival recordings; 2022 version)
 Auliʻi Cravalho – Moana (archival recordings; 2022 version)

Japanese version (Tokyo DisneySea):
 Takashi Aoyagi – Mickey Mouse
 Kyoko Satomi – Evil Queen/Old Hag
 Tamio Ōki – Magic Mirror
 Toshiko Sawada – Maleficent
 Kumiko Mori – Ursula
 Koichi Yamadera – Genie, Stitch

See also
World of Color
Rivers of Light
Harmonious
Celebrate! Tokyo Disneyland
Disney Dreams!

References

External links

 Fantasmic! at Disneyland
 Fantasmic! at Disney's Hollywood Studios

Operating amusement attractions
Amusement park attractions introduced in 1998
Amusement park attractions that closed in 2020
1992 establishments in California
1998 establishments in Florida
2011 establishments in Japan
2020 disestablishments in Japan
Amusement park attractions introduced in 1992
Amusement park attractions introduced in 2011
Audio-Animatronic attractions
Disneyland
Disney's Hollywood Studios
Tokyo DisneySea
Frontierland
Mediterranean Harbor (Tokyo DisneySea)
Sunset Boulevard (Disney's Hollywood Studios)
Walt Disney Parks and Resorts attractions
Walt Disney Parks and Resorts fireworks
Fiction about witchcraft
Dragons in popular culture
Fiction about shapeshifting
Fiction about magic